Alireza Behboudi (born ) is an Iranian male volleyball player, who plays as a setter. He was part of the Iran men's national volleyball team. Currently he is a member of club Shahrdari Tabriz in the Iranian Volleyball Super League Behboudi named MVP in 2016 AVC Cup.

Honours

National team
Asian Games
Silver medal (1): 2002
AVC Cup
Gold medal (1): 2016
Asian Junior Championship
Gold medal (1): 1998

Club
Asian Championship
Gold medal (1): 2002 (Paykan)
Silver medal (1): 2004 (Paykan)
Iranian Super League
Champions (1): 2003 (Paykan)

Individual
Most Valuable Player: 2016 AVC Cup

References

1979 births
Living people
Iranian men's volleyball players
Volleyball players at the 2002 Asian Games
People from Qazvin
Asian Games medalists in volleyball
Asian Games silver medalists for Iran
Medalists at the 2002 Asian Games